{{Infobox rail line
| name          =  Sauerland-Express
| color         = 121cc1
| routenumber   = 430, 435
| linelength_km = 209
| speed         =  (maximum)
| image         = NRW-RE17.png
| image_width   = 200px
| operator      = DB Regio NRW
| locale        = North Rhine-Westphalia, Germany
| map = 
{{Routemap|inline=1 |title =no |footnote=Source: German railway atlas|map=
KS+BHFa~~0~~Hagen Hbf
BHF~~14~~Schwerte (Ruhr)
BHF~~29~~Fröndenberg
BHF~~37~~Wickede (Ruhr)
BHF~~49~~Neheim-Hüsten
BHF~~57~~Arnsberg (Westf)
HST~~63~~Oeventrop
HST~~68~~Freienohl
BHF~~77~~Meschede
BHF~~86~~Bestwig
HST~~92~~Olsberg
BHF~~100~~Brilon Wald
pHST~~106~~
pBHF~~110~~
pHST~~116~~
HST~~118~~Bredelar
BHF~~126~~Marsberg
HST~~132~~Westheim (Westf)
BHF~~142~~Scherfede
BHF~~152~~Warburg (Westf)
STR~~ ~~  (NVV Line R3 from here)
STR+GRZq~~ ~~NRW / Hesse state border
eHST~~158~~
BHF~~179~~
eBHF~~184~~
eHST~~189~~
epBHF~~193~~
\eABZgl\exKBHFeq~~205~~
KBHFe~~209~~{{BSsplit|<big>Kassel-Wilhelmshöhe</big>|(individual services)}}
}}
}}

The Sauerland-Express' (RE 17) is a Regional-Express service in the German state of North Rhine-Westphalia, running from Hagen to Warburg (Westf). A few services run to or from Kassel-Wilhelmshöhe. It is managed by the Verkehrsverbund Rhein-Ruhr (Rhine-Ruhr Transport Association), the Verkehrsgemeinschaft Ruhr-Lippe (Ruhr-Lippe Transport Company, VRL), the Nahverkehrsverbund Paderborn-Höxter (Paderborn-Höxter Local Transport Association, nph) and the Nordhessischer Verkehrsverbund (North Hessian Transport Association, NVV). It is operated by DB Regio NRW with electric multiple units of classes 612 and 644 (Bombardier Talent).

The operation of the service from December 2016 was awarded as part of the Sauerland Net (Sauerland-Netz). Previously the line had been operated by DB Regio under a directly awarded contract.

Services

The service runs between Hagen and Kassel-Wilhelmshöhe every two hours and between Warburg and Hagen additional services produce an hourly service. The services to and from Kassel use electric multiple units of class 612 (RegioSwinger) while those on the cycle turning back at Warburg use class 628.4 sets. On Fridays and Sundays, some special services run to Willingen. The Fröndenberg–Bestwig section is also supplemented with an hourly service of the RE 57 (the Dortmund-Sauerland-Express), which continues to Winterberg.

On the section between Warburg and Kassel, the RE 17 has only stopped in Hofgeismar since the timetable change on 15 December 2013, which also omitted a stop at Kassel Hauptbahnhof. This shortened the journey time to and from Kassel-Wilhelmshöhe by up to 13 minutes.

Rollingstock

Earlier the RE 17 was operated with Class 218 locomotives hauling three to six Silberling carriages together with class 624 diesel multiple units. The Warburg cycles were changed in the mid-1990s to class 628.4 DMUs. From the beginning of the 21st century, the locomotive-hauled trains on the Kassel cycles were replaced by class 612 (RegioSwinger) DMUs. Individual services to Willingen were operated with trains hauled by class 218 locomotives until 2006. Since December 2016, class 644 sets have been used alongside the class 612 sets.

 Current operations

The contract for the operation of the Sauerland-Express from 2016 as part of the Sauerland network was let to DB Regio. The rolling stock to be used as part of a replacement concept, will be DMUs of the Link type (II or III) from the Polish manufacturer Pesa SA. The new trains for the Sauerland network will only available from December 2018. The delivery delay must be bridged by replacement rolling stock. Most of the operations of the Sauerland-Express between Warburg and Kassel were abandoned during this process, this form of transport instead being provided by extending the RE 11 "Rhein-Hellweg-Express" (Düsseldorf – Duisburg – Dortmund – Hamm – Paderborn – Kassel-Wilhelmshöhe).

 Route 

The line operates from Hagen to Schwerte on the Hagen–Hamm railway and from Schwerte to Warburg on the Upper Ruhr Valley Railway. In Warburg it changes to the Frederick William Northern Railway, also known as the Hessische Nordbahn'' (Hessian Northern Railway).

Connections

Notes

See also

 List of regional rail lines in North Rhine-Westphalia

Rail services in North Rhine-Westphalia